Patrick John Connaughton (23 September 1949 – 12 November 2022) was an English professional footballer who played as a goalkeeper. He played 387 league and cup games in a 16-year career. He also represented England at youth level on three occasions.

Connaughton began his career at Manchester United, turning professional in 1966, but made just three first team appearances in April 1972. He also played two games on loan at Halifax Town in 1969, and played 25 games on loan at Torquay United in 1971–72. He joined Sheffield United in October 1972 for a £15,000 fee, but only played 12 games for the club before he transferred to Port Vale in May 1974. He established himself in the first team, and made 218 appearances, picking up the club's Player of the Year award in 1974–75. He joined Altrincham in 1980 for an enormously successful two-year spell, picking up championship medals for the Alliance Premier League in 1979–80 and 1980–81, winners medals in the Conference League Cup and Cheshire Senior Cup, and runners-up medals in the Conference League Cup and FA Trophy.

Career

Manchester United
Connaughton joined the Manchester United groundstaff in January 1965, signing as an apprentice in May the same year. He turned professional in October 1966, but would have to wait almost six years for his United debut, despite playing three games for England youth in 1967 and 1968. In the meantime he was loaned to Halifax Town and to Torquay United.

His Manchester United debut finally came on 4 April 1972 in a First Division game against Sheffield United at Bramall Lane, a 1–1 draw. He played two further games that month, in defeats to Leicester City and Manchester City; the defeat in the Manchester derby came at Old Trafford. However United had a wide variety of goalkeeping talent in Alex Stepney, Jimmy Rimmer, Harry Gregg, David Gaskell and Pat Dunne; this meant Connaughton played only three first-team matches for the club.

Sheffield United
He returned to Bramall Lane in October 1972, but this time as a Sheffield United player, costing the Blades £15,000. He did not appear in 1972–73, and played only 12 First Division games in 1973–74. He worked well with goalkeeping coach Alan Hodgkinson, but was given a free transfer after Ken Furphy replaced John Harris as manager.

Port Vale
Connaughton moved on to Third Division side Port Vale in May 1974, where he replaced Alan Boswell. He had turned down a lucrative offer from Gillingham as his fiancé was unwilling to move to Kent; he later said that Vale manager Roy Sproson fell off his chair after hearing the terms Gillingham offered, but agreed to match them. Connaughton played 47 games in the 1974–75 campaign, leaving deputy Reg Edwards to play just twice. For his consistency he was voted Player of the Year by the club's supporters. He missed just one game of the 1975–76 season, with Manchester United loanee David Ryan covering him for a 2–1 defeat at Swindon Town on 17 January.

He then faced stiff competition from a young Trevor Dance, but still managed to play 44 games in the 1976–77 season, helping the club to reach the fifth round of the FA Cup. Connaughton missed eight games in 1977–78 due to a knee injury, but remained Vale's first team keeper as the club suffered relegation into the Fourth Division. He again suffered with injuries at the start of the 1978–79 season, however he lost his No. 1 jersey to Dance in January 1979, and played just 22 games in 1978–79. He spent much of the 1979–80 season on the bench, and played just nine games. He made 218 total appearances for the "Valiants".

Altrincham
He joined Altrincham in time to play 15 league games of the club's Alliance Premier League championship winning 1979–80 season. He also played in the Conference League Cup final defeat to Northwich Victoria. He was an ever-present in 1980–81, as "Alty" retained their league title, and also beat Kettering Town in the Conference League Cup final. He also played in the club's 4–1 defeat to Liverpool at Anfield in the FA Cup third round.

"Alty" dropped to 11th place in 1981–82, though won one last success in the form of the Cheshire Senior Cup final, following a 1–0 win over Runcorn. He also helped the club to the final of the FA Trophy, where they lost 1–0 to Enfield at Wembley Stadium. He also helped the club to another FA Cup run, in which they beat former club Sheffield United and then York City, before being knocked out by Burnley. He retired at the end of the season at the age of 32, due to business commitments; he played a total of 127 games for Altrincham, winning 47 clean sheets.

Style of play
Altrincham F.C. historian Terry Rowley described Connaughton as an "unfussy, dominant and quietly competent keeper". Port Vale teammate Brian Horton praised his qualities as an all-round goalkeeper, his kicking ability, as well as his character.

Later life
Connaughton started up in the wastepaper business while playing for Altrincham. He married Anne. Connaughton died on 12 November 2022, at age 73.

Career statistics

Honours
Individual
Port Vale F.C. Player of the Year: 1974–75

Altrincham
Alliance Premier League: 1979–80 & 1980–81
Conference League Cup: 1981
Cheshire Senior Cup: 1982

References

1949 births
2022 deaths
Footballers from Wigan
English footballers
Association football goalkeepers
Manchester United F.C. players
Halifax Town A.F.C. players
Torquay United F.C. players
Sheffield United F.C. players
Port Vale F.C. players
Altrincham F.C. players
English Football League players
National League (English football) players